The Dungummin Ogham Stone, also known as the Clonkeiffy standing stone, is an ancient monument found on a field near a crossroads on the R194 road, south of  Ballyjamesduff, County Cavan, in Ireland.

The Ogham stone is sandstone, is about 1.6m tall, 0.48m wide and 0.36m in thickness, tapering in the cross section almost to a point. The inscription on the north-western side is a personal name, "OVOMANI". The western side of the stone is damaged. It was dated by S. Ziegler .  The south side carries two crosses; in the west and north a cross is engraved.

See also

Killycluggin Stone
Cloonmorris Ogham stone

Bibliography 
 Joseph B. Meehan: Cavan ogham stones: II, The Dungimmin Ogham 1920
 Damien McManus: A Guide to Ogam. An Sagart, Maynooth 1991, .
 Philip I. Powell: The Ogham Stones of Ireland: The Complete & Illustrated Index 2011
 Sabine Ziegler: Die Sprache der altirischen Ogam-Inschriften. Vandenhoeck & Ruprecht, Göttingen 1994,

External links 
 Megalithic monuments of Ireland

Archaeological sites in County Cavan